Playas (officially known as General Villamil Playas) is a coastal city located in  the province of Guayas, Ecuador. It is the seat of Playas Canton, created in 1989. As of the census of 2001, there are 24,070 people residing within city limits. The city takes its official name from the independence hero, General José de Villamil. Playas is an important tourist center and is located approximately 96 km from Guayaquil.

Economy

The economy of Playas is largely tourism based, with a number of hotels and resorts located in the area. The Playas include Playa General Villamil, Paseo Acuático Recinto Data de Villamil, Playa el Arenal, Playa de data de Villamil, and Playa de Puerto Engabao. Aside from tourism, Playas has a thriving fishing community and is known for its seafood cuisine. Playas is also home to the Gómez Rendón Military Academy.

References

External links
www.hosteriaeldelfin.com, in Spanish.
, in Spanish.
www.facebook.com/playasvillamil, in Spanish.
Information and Digital Magazine about Playas Villamil, in Spanish.
What to do in Playas.

Photo gallery

Populated places in Guayas Province
Beaches of Ecuador
Surfing locations in Ecuador